Joseph Andrew Vincent McCann (23 September 1925 – 7 September 1989) was an Australian diver. He competed in the men's 3 metre springboard event at the 1956 Summer Olympics.

References

External links
 
 
 

1925 births
1989 deaths
Australian male divers
Olympic divers of Australia
Divers at the 1956 Summer Olympics
Divers from Sydney
20th-century Australian people